Volley Piacenza was an Italian professional men's volleyball club based in Piacenza, northern Italy. They played in the Italian Volleyball League. The club ceased to exist in 2018 due to financial problems.

Although the club reached the Italian 1st division for the first time only in 2002, after have dominated the Italian 2nd division and winning also the Italian Cup, it has already played 9 finals in Italy, including 5 for the Italian Title(winning only in 2009 versus the strong Trento), 2 for the Italian Cup(won in 2013 and lost in 2006) and 2 for the Italian Supercup (beating Macerata 3–2 in 2009 and losing versus the same team in 2014 again after a tie-break). Piacenza played also a Champion's League final, lost 3–2 in Poland versus Russia's Zenit Kazan, 2 Cev Cup finals (again losing twice) and won 2 other European cups: in 2006 the Top Teams Cup, and in 2013 the Challenge Cup, defeating Ural Ufa from Russia with a 3–0 win in both first and second legs of final, achieving also an impressive 12–0 record, without losing a single set. It's among the strongest teams in Italy and also in Europe since 2003.

Achievements
 CEV Champions League
  2008
 CEV Cup
  2006
 CEV Challenge Cup
  2013
 Italian Championship (SuperLega)
  2009
  2007, 2008, 2013
 Italian Cup
  2014
 Italian SuperCup
  2009
 Italian Championship Serie A2
  2002
 Italian Cup Serie A2
  2002

Team

Notable players

 2002–2003  Đula Mešter
 2003–2004  Simone Rosalba  
 2003–2004  Osvaldo Hernández
 2003–2007  Nikola Grbić
 2003–2007, 2008–2010  Leonel Marshall
 2003–2008  Vigor Bovolenta
 2004–2005  Anderson Rodrigues
 2005–2008  Vencislav Simeonov
 2006–2008  Paolo Cozzi
 2007–2008  Frantz Granvorka
 2007–2008  Sérgio Santos
 2007–2008  Israel Rodríguez
 2006–2010  João Paulo Bravo    
 2007–2010  Novica Bjelica
 2007–2010  Dante Boninfante
 2007–2010, 2014–2015  Marco Meoni
 2008–2009  Guillermo Falasca 
 2009–2010  Valdir Sequeira
 2010–2013  Maxwell Holt 
 2011–2012  Vladimir Nikolov
 2011–2012  Andrey Zhekov
 2012–2014  Robertlandy Simón
 2013–2014  Kévin Le Roux
 2014–2014  Valerio Vermiglio
 2014–2015  Aleksey Ostapenko
 2003–2017  Hristo Zlatanov
 2010–2017  Luca Tencati
 2011–2017  Samuele Papi

References

Italian volleyball clubs
Sport in Piacenza
Volleyball clubs established in 1982
Volleyball clubs disestablished in 2018
1982 establishments in Italy
2018 disestablishments in Italy